The Iowa–Penn State wrestling rivalry is an American collegiate wrestling rivalry between the Iowa Hawkeyes and the Penn State Nittany Lions. The two programs are some of the most successful in the history of NCAA Division I wrestling. The Hawkeyes and Nittany Lions have the second- and third-most team national championships, with 24 and 10 respectively, only trailing Oklahoma State's 34 titles. The series ascended to the national stage in the past decade with Penn State's rise to the top of the wrestling world, as they won 8 of 10 team titles during the 2010s. Fellow Big Ten schools Iowa and Ohio State were the only other teams to win during the 2010s.

The rivalry began in 1982 and has been wrestled annually. It was amplified when Penn State joined the Big Ten Conference in 1993. It has been described as "the nation’s fiercest wrestling rivalry", and has resulted in sold out venues due to the popularity of dual meets.  While the Hawkeyes dominated the early stages of the rivalry, it has become more balanced of late, with Penn State taking 6 of the last 13 matches. Since 2008, the rivalry has consistently been a Top 10 matchup. The 2020 contest between #1 Iowa and #2 Penn State became the most-watched wrestling telecast in the history of the Big Ten Network, drawing 342,955 viewers. The Hawkeyes prevailed over the Nittany Lions by a score of 19 to 17 in the most highly anticipated contest in the rivalry's history.

Match Results
The following is a complete list of match results, through the 2021-22 season.

References 

Big Ten Conference rivalries
Iowa Hawkeyes wrestling
Penn State Nittany Lions wrestling